The 2014–15 RB Leipzig season was the 6th season in club history and their first season competing in the 2. Bundesliga. The team missed out on promotion and finished in the upper half of the league.

Kits

Background
Leipzig will play in the 2014–15 2. Bundesliga after having been promoted from 3. Liga by finishing second, where they only played for one  season.

Transfers

In

Out

Friendlies

2. Bundesliga

Fixtures & results

League table

DFB–Pokal

DFB–Pokal review
RB Leipzig were drawn against Bundesliga side SC Paderborn in the first round, the match will be played in Leipzig. They won in extra time against FC Erzgebirge Aue in the second round and reached the third round of the DFB–Pokal for the first time. They were drawn against Bundesliga team VfL Wolfsburg, who they beat in the 2011–12 DFB-Pokal first round.

DFB–Pokal results

Player informations

|-
|colspan="10"|Players who left the club during the 2014–15 season
|-

|}

Notes

1.Kickoff time in Central European Time/Central European Summer Time.
2.RB Leipzig's goals first.

References

Leipzig
RB Leipzig seasons